The national seal of the Comoros has the crescent found on the national flag in the center; within this crescent are the four stars found on the flag.  A sun with rays extended is right above the crescent. Around the focal point, the name of the nation (Union of the Comoros) is written in both French and Arabic. The border is composed of two olive branches, with the national motto at the bottom in French.

Gallery

See also
Coats of arms of African nations
The Comoros
Coat of arms
Heraldry

References 

National symbols of the Comoros
Comoros
Comoros
Comoros